At First Light (also titled First Light) is a 2018 Canadian science fiction thriller drama film written and directed by Jason Stone and starring Stefanie Scott and Théodore Pellerin.

Cast
Stefanie Scott as Alex
Théodore Pellerin as Sean
Saïd Taghmaoui as Cal
James Wotherspoon as Tom
Percy Hynes White as Oscar
Jahmil French as Nathan
Kate Burton as Kate

Release
The film premiered at South by Southwest in 2018.  In August that year, it was announced that Gravitas Ventures acquired distribution rights to the film in the U.S., Australia and New Zealand.  The film was released in theaters and on demand on September 28, 2018.

Reception
The film has a 54% rating on Rotten Tomatoes based on 13 reviews.

Chris Knight of the National Post gave the film a negative review and wrote, "The actors are fine, though the drab screenplay does them no favours." Kevin Crust of the Los Angeles Times gave the film a positive review and wrote, "Pellerin and Scott are such deeply compelling performers that you are likely to forgive the familiarity of the lovers-on-the-run, first-contact narratives." Matt Donato of Slash Film rated the film a 7 out of 10 and wrote that it "nimbly condenses similar, more complicated stories for a greater storytelling accomplishment."

Nick Allen of RogerEbert.com gave the film a negative review and wrote, "Stone’s movie is one of the most frustrating kinds to run into while covering a festival  upcoming filmmakers, the calling card project." Joshua Speiser of Film Threat awarded the film two stars out of five and wrote, "Try as I might, I just wasn’t all that invested in the fate of Alex and Sean or their own private close encounter with the third kind. Which is a shame as the filmmaker shows a keen flair for creating both an interesting visual and aural palette." Peter Debruge of Variety gave the film a negative review and wrote that it "doesn’t invent anything new, per se, but somehow, in splicing elements from other movies, it fails to achieve the emotional core of its own formula." Justin Lowe of The Hollywood Reporter also gave the film a negative review and wrote, "Lacking the flash of big-budget blockbusters or the originality of a uniquely imagined world, First Light is left trying to make the best of overly familiar sci-fi themes."

References

External links